Silverdale is an unincorporated community in Ohio Township, Spencer County, in the U.S. state of Indiana.

Geography

References

Unincorporated communities in Spencer County, Indiana
Unincorporated communities in Indiana